Bacurius was a Roman general and a member of the royal family of Iberia (modern Georgia) mentioned by several Greco-Roman authors of the 4th and 5th centuries. It is accepted, but not universally, that all these refer to the same person, an Iberian "king" or "prince", who joined the Roman military ranks. Scholarly opinion is divided whether Bacurius can be identified with one of the kings named Bakur, attested in medieval Georgian annals, who might have taken refuge in territories obtained by the Eastern Roman Empire during the Roman–Persian Wars that were fought over the Caucasus.

The name  is the Latin form of the Greek Bakour, itself a variant of the Middle Iranian Pakur, derived from Old Iranian bag-puhr ('son of a god'). The name "Bakur" is the Georgian (ბაკურ) and Armenian (Բակուր) attestation of Middle Iranian Pakur.

Ammianus Marcellinus, Tyrannius Rufinus, and Zosimus report that Bacurius was "king of Iberians", but Gelasius of Caesarea does not call him king, but merely scion of the kings of Iberia. Bacurius was a tribunus sagittariorum at the Battle of Adrianople with the Goths in 378 and then served as dux Palaestinae and comes domesticorum until 394, when he became magister militum and commanded a "barbarian" contingent in Emperor Theodosius I’s (r. 379–395) campaign against the Roman usurper Eugenius and met his death, according to Zosimus, at the Battle of the Frigidus. According to Socrates of Constantinople, Bacurius had also fought in Theodosius's earlier campaign against Magnus Maximus.

All contemporary sources are unequivocal in praising Bacurius's military skills and courage. Rufinus, whom Bacurius visited several times on the Mount of Olives and served him as a source of Christianization of Iberia, describes the general as a pious Christian, while the rhetorician Libanius, with whom Bacurius held correspondence, evidently regards him as a pagan and praises him both as a soldier and a man of culture. The oldest Georgian Bir el Qutt inscriptions mention Bacurius.

References

Sources

394 deaths
4th-century Byzantine people
Ancient history of Georgia (country)
Byzantine generals
Byzantine people of Georgian descent
Chosroid dynasty
Comites domesticorum
Correspondents of Libanius
Magistri militum
Royalty of Georgia (country)
Year of birth unknown